List of magazines in Croatia is an incomplete list of magazines published in Croatia.

Contemporary

Magazines
BUG (1992), monthly computer magazine
Drvo znanja (1998), monthly youth magazine
Globus (1990), weekly newsmagazine
Gloria (1994), weekly women's magazine
Hrvatska revija, quarterly magazine published by Matica hrvatska
Hrvatski vojnik (1991), weekly military magazine published by the Ministry of Defence
Modra lasta (1954), children's monthly
Nacional (1995), weekly
Novi Plamen (2007), political quarterly
Novosti, Serbian minority magazine
Oris (1999), magazine for architecture
PC Chip, monthly computer magazine
Republika (1945), monthly magazine for literature, art and society
Vidi (1994), monthly computer magazine
Vijenac (1993), biweekly magazine for literature, art and science published by Matica hrvatska
VP: Magazin za vojnu povijest (2011), monthly magazine about the history of war
Zarez (1999), biweekly magazine for literature, arts and culture
PLACE2GO (2006), travel magazine, quarterly

International magazines
Cosmopolitan
Elle
FHM
Forbes
FourFourTwo
GEO
Grazia
Men's Health
Le Monde diplomatique
National Geographic
Playboy
Reader's Digest

Defunct

Magazines

Computer
 GamePlay

Literary
Kokot (1916-1918)

Music 
Pop Express (1969-1970)

Politics
Feral Tribune (1993-2008)
Hrvatska ljevica (1993-2005)

Regional
Nedjeljna Dalmacija (1971-2002)

Tabloid
Slobodni tjednik (1990-1993)

Women's magazines
Mila (1988-2005)

See also 
Media in Croatia
List of newspapers in Croatia

References

Croatia
Magazines